Kharar is a historical town of Ghatal and one of the oldest municipality in Asia. This city is located in the Ghatal Subdivision of the Indian state of West Bengal.

History
In 1884, according to section 8 of the then Bengal Municipality Act Kharar municipality had been established with Rayerdanga, Krishnapur, Udaygunge and Dalapatipur village under its jurisdiction. Initially Kharar was under Arambagh subdivision of Hooghly district. Later it was transferred to Ghatal subdivision of Paschim Medinipur

Geography

Location

Area overview
Ishwar Chandra Vidyasagar, scholar, social reformer and a key figure of the Bengal Renaissance, was born at Birsingha on 26 September 1820.

Ghatal subdivision, shown in the map alongside, has alluvial soils. Around 85% of the total cultivated area is cropped more than once. It  has a density of population of 1,099 per km2, but being a small subdivision only a little over a fifth of the people in the district reside in this subdivision. 14.33% of the population lives in urban areas and 86.67% lives in the rural areas.

Note: The map alongside presents some of the notable locations in the subdivision. All places marked in the map are linked in the larger full screen map.

Economy
In ancient times, this area was known for its brass and bell utensils and as goldsmiths.

The principal crops are paddy and potato.

Kharar, along with the neighbouring areas and neighbouring cities like Ghatal, Chandrakona and Ramjibanpur are known for the manufacture of brass and bell metal.

Administration
Kharar is administered by the Kharar Municipality. Kharar municipality was established in 1888.
The Kharar city is divided into 10 wards for which elections are held every 5 years.

Demographics
As per 2011 Census of India, Kharar had a total population of 12,118 of which 6,124 (51%) were males and 5,994 (49%) were females. Population in the age range 0–6 years was 1,167. The total number of literate persons in Kharar was 9,364 (85.51% of the population over 6 years).

 India census, Kharar had a population of 11,580. Males constitute 51% of the population and females 49%. Kharar has an average literacy rate of 74%, higher than the national average of 59.5%: male literacy is 81%, and female literacy is 67%. In Kharar, 11% of the population is under 6 years of age.

Education
There are two high school and more than ten primary schools in Kharar. The name of the high schools are - 1. Kharar Sri Aurobindo Vidyamandir. 2. Kharar S.K.H.Hait Balika Vidyalaya. Ghatal  Satabarsiki Mahavidyalaya and Chandrakona Vidyasagar Mahavidyalaya are two nearest college of Kharar.

Culture
David J. McCutchion mentions:
The Sitaram temple of the Maji family as a standard three-storied trayodashratna structure, built in 1865, measuring 15’ square with terracotta and stucco decorations. 
The Narayana temple of the Santra family as a flat roofed structure decorated with pinnacles, 19th century built with terracotta decorations.
The Shiva temple as a rekha deul or pirha deul, with a pirha porch of base dimension smaller than the main temple, measuring 13’ 9” square + 12’ 6” square, brick built in the 18th century, with terracotta figures. 
A temple with some decoration as a pancha-ratna with smooth rekha turrets,. 
 A temple with some decoration as a West Bengal nava-ratna with ridged turrets. 
 The Narayan temple at Rayapara as a straight-corniced nava-ratna or a double-storied flat roof temple with turrets.

Kharar picture gallery

References

External links

Cities and towns in Paschim Medinipur district
Cities in West Bengal